Longfellow Middle School can refer to several schools in the United States:

 Henry Wadsworth Longfellow Middle School, Fairfax County, Virginia
 Longfellow Middle School (Norman, Oklahoma), Norman, Oklahoma
 Longfellow Middle School (San Antonio, Texas), San Antonio, Texas
 Longfellow Middle School (La Crosse, Wisconsin), La Crosse, Wisconsin
 Longfellow Middle School (Wauwatosa, Wisconsin), Wauwatosa, Wisconsin
 Longfellow Middle School (Berkeley, California), Berkeley, California
 Henry W. Longfellow Middle School (Indianapolis, Indiana), Indianapolis, Indiana